Club Atlético Olimpia, or simply Olimpia, is a sports club based in Montevideo, Uruguay. The club's main sport is basketball, with the basketball team having won eight championships in the now-defunct Campeonato Uruguayo Federal de Básquetbol (CFB). The team currently competes in the Liga Uruguaya de Básquetbol (LUB).

History
Olimpia was founded on 17 September 1918. In 1946, Olimpia won the South American Club Championships. Between 1923 and 1972, the team won eight championships in the Campeonato Uruguayo Federal de Básquetbol (CFB).

References

External links
 Club Olimpia on Básquet Total 

Basketball teams in Montevideo
Basketball teams in Uruguay
Basketball teams established in 1918
1918 establishments in Uruguay